Where Did You Go may refer to:
"Where Did You Go?", a song by Jax Jones and MNEK
"Where Did You Go" (Kiana song), a song by Kiana released in 2023
"Where Did You Go", a song by Boyzone from the album Where We Belong
"Where Did You Go?", a song by the Doubleclicks from the album Dimetrodon
"Where Did You Go?", a song by the Four Tops from the 1965 album Four Tops